Henry St. Clair was an American politician. He represented Macon County, Alabama in 1872. He lived in Tuskegee. He testified about the political climate, canvassing, and acts of intimidation against African Americans who overwhelmingly supported the Republican Party.

He received the most votes November 8, 1870.

See also
African-American officeholders during and following the Reconstruction era

References

Year of birth missing
19th-century American politicians
Year of death missing
Republican Party members of the Alabama House of Representatives
African-American state legislators in Alabama
African-American politicians during the Reconstruction Era